The Ministry of Traditional Industries and Small Enterprise Development was a Sri Lankan government ministry responsible for oversight of policy guidance and facilitation for traditional local industry, SMEs and the handicraft industry, with a goal of helping improve these industries to compete on the international market. It thus targeted home-based enterprises and cited poverty reduction, rural development and inclusive growth and social development as secondary focuses. The ministry was part of the Rajapaksa cabinet.

List of ministers

Parties

See also
 List of ministries of Sri Lanka
Economy of Sri Lanka
Poverty in Sri Lanka

References

External links
 Ministry of Traditional Industries and Small Enterprise Development
 Government of Sri Lanka

Traditional Industries and Small Enterprise Development
Traditional Industries and Small Enterprise Development